Fly Black Hearts is the fifth studio album of the band Chicosci released on September 17, 2009, and their first album Under MCA Records. the band's carrier single "Diamond Shotgun" was premiered at the NU Rock 107.5 FM on June 29, 2009. and a music video was premiered on MYX Channel on September 13, 2009.

Track listing

References

2009 albums
Chicosci albums
Rock albums by Filipino artists